The 2007 Division 1 season was the 42nd of the competition of the first-tier football in Senegal.  The tournament was organized by the Senegalese Football Federation.  The season began on 13 January and finished on 16 September.  It was the last year they played at an amateur level, the following would be at a professional level.  AS Douanes won their fourth title, the next club to win two consecutive titles.  AS Douanes along with Saloum would compete in the 2008 CAF Champions League the following season.  ASC Linguère (participated in Division 2) who won the 2007 Senegalese Cup participated in the 2008 CAF Confederation Cup, along with Casa Sport, third in the final phase.  Under an undecided reason, not a single club was relegated as the number of clubs risen to twenty in the following season.

The season would feature 18 clubs. 174 matches (144 in the first phase and 30 in the second phase) were played and 289 goals were scored (229 in the first phase and 60 in the second phase).  It was the second time that feature the first and second phases, the first phase featured the group system with a total of 72 matches for each group, the second or final phase would consist of six clubs with a larger total of 30 matches, each club played a total of ten matches and the highest number of points would decide the season's champion.  This would be last season to do so, the playoff system would be restored in the following season.

AS Douanes was the defending team of the title.

Participating clubs

 ASC Renaissance de Dakar
 ASC Port Autonome
 AS Douanes
 ASC Jeanne d'Arc
 ASC Saloum
 US Gorée
 Casa Sport
 ASC Yakaar
 ASC Xam Xam

 ASC HLM
 ASC Diaraf
 ASC Thiès
 Dakar Université Club
 ASC SUNEOR
 ASEC Ndiambour
 Stade de Mbour
 US Ouakam
 Guédiawaye FC

Overview
The league was contested by 18 teams and two groups, the first phase consisted of 9 clubs in each of the two groups and the second and final phase consisted of only four clubs.

League standings

Group A

Group B

Second and final phase

References

Football in Senegal
Senegal
Senegal Premier League seasons